The Internal Family Systems Model (IFS) is an integrative approach to individual psychotherapy developed by Richard C. Schwartz in the 1980s. It combines systems thinking with the view that the mind is made up of relatively discrete subpersonalities, each with its own unique viewpoint and qualities. IFS uses family systems theory to understand how these collections of subpersonalities are organized.

Parts

IFS posits that the mind is made up of multiple parts, and underlying them is a person's core or true Self. Like members of a family, a person's inner parts can take on extreme roles or subpersonalities. Each part has its own perspective, interests, memories, and viewpoint. A core tenet of IFS is that every part has a positive intent, even if its actions are counterproductive and/or cause dysfunction. There is no need to fight with, coerce, or eliminate parts; the IFS method promotes internal connection and harmony to bring the mind back into balance.
 
IFS therapy aims to heal wounded parts and restore mental balance. The first step is to access the core Self and then, from there, understand the different parts in order to heal them.

In the IFS model, there are three general types of parts:

 Exiles represent psychological trauma, often from childhood, and they carry the pain and fear. Exiles may become isolated from the other parts and polarize the system. Managers and Firefighters try to protect a person's consciousness by preventing the Exiles' pain from coming to awareness.
 Managers take on a preemptive, protective role. They influence the way a person interacts with the external world, protecting the person from harm and preventing painful or traumatic experiences from flooding the person's conscious awareness.
 Firefighters emerge when Exiles break out and demand attention. They work to divert attention away from the Exile's hurt and shame, which leads to impulsive and/or inappropriate behaviors like overeating, drug use or violence. They can also distract a person from pain by excessively focusing attention on more subtle activities such as overworking or overmedicating.

The internal system

IFS focuses on the relationships between parts and the core Self. The goal of therapy is to create a cooperative and trusting relationship between the Self and each part.

There are three primary types of relationships between parts: protection, polarization, and alliance.

 Protection is provided by Managers and Firefighters. They intend to spare Exiles from harm and protect the individual from the Exile's pain.
 Polarization occurs between two parts that battle each other to determine how a person feels or behaves in a certain situation. Each part believes that it must act as it does in order to counter the extreme behavior of the other part. IFS has a method for working with polarized parts.
 Alliance is formed between two different parts if they're working together to accomplish the same goal.

IFS method

IFS practitioners report a well-defined therapeutic method for individual therapy based on the following principles. In this description, the term "protector" refers to either a manager or firefighter.

 Parts in extreme roles carry "burdens", which are painful emotions or negative beliefs that they have taken on as a result of past harmful experiences, often in childhood. These burdens are not intrinsic to the part and therefore they can be released or "unburdened" through IFS therapy, allowing the part to assume its natural healthy role.
 The Self is the agent of psychological healing. Therapists help their clients to access and remain in Self, providing guidance along the way.
 Protectors usually can't let go of their protective roles and transform until the Exiles they are protecting have been unburdened.
 There is no attempt to work with Exiles until the client has obtained permission from the Protectors who are protecting it. This allegedly makes the method relatively safe, even in working with traumatized parts.
 The Self is the natural leader of the internal system. However, because of past harmful incidents or relationships, Protectors have stepped in and taken over for the Self. One Protector after another is activated and takes the lead, causing dysfunctional behavior. Protectors are also frequently in conflict with each other, resulting in internal chaos or stagnation. The aim is for the Protectors to trust the Self and allow it to lead the system, creating internal harmony under its guidance.

The first step is to help the client access the Self. Next, the Self gets to know the Protector(s), its positive intent, and develops a trusting relationship with it. Then, with the Protector's permission, the client accesses the Exile(s) to uncover the childhood incident or relationship which is the source of the burden(s) it carries. The Exile is retrieved from the past situation and guided to release its burdens. Finally, the Protector can then let go of its protective role and assume a healthy one.

Criticisms
Therapists Sharon A. Deacon and Jonathan C. Davis suggested that working with one's parts may "be emotional and anxiety-provoking for clients", and that IFS may not work well with delusional, paranoid, or schizophrenic clients who may not be grounded in reality and therefore misuse the idea of "parts".  It is worth noting that, as of yet, there is no evidence in support of these concerns.

See also
Dissociation (psychology)
Ego-state therapy
Family therapy
Inner Relationship Focusing

References

Further reading

Books

Peer-reviewed articles

External links
 
 IFS Latinoamerica

Psychological models
Psychotherapeutical theories
Conceptions of self